Yahk  is an unincorporated hamlet in southeastern British Columbia, Canada, just north of the Canada-U.S. border. Yahk Provincial Park borders the village to the south. Yahk is located on the Moyie River.

CBC Television talk show The Hour taped a live episode in Yahk on February 9, 2006.  The show was there in part because of Kyle MacDonald, the blogger behind one red paperclip, who said in an interview with CBC News he would go anywhere to trade "except Yahk, British Columbia".  He eventually relented with the catch that CBC News had to do a show from Yahk.

See also
Yaak River

References

External links
 Yahk on BritishColumbia.com

East Kootenay
Populated places in the Regional District of Central Kootenay
Unincorporated settlements in British Columbia
Designated places in British Columbia